Fancy Boy is an Australian six-part sketch comedy television series which screened on ABC2 from 8 December 2016 to 12 January 2017.

Fancy Boy stars John Campbell, Stuart Daulman, Henry Stone, Jonathan Schuster, Greg Larsen, and Anne Edmonds. Guest appearances include Ronny Chieng, Anna McGahan, Jack Charles, George Kapiniaris, Gerry Connolly.

It is produced by Nicole Minchin, series produced by Declan Fay, executive produced by Stuart Menzies and directed by Colin Cairnes. The soundtrack is composed by Glenn Richards.

See also 
 List of Australian television series

References

External links 
 

Australian Broadcasting Corporation original programming
Australian satirical television shows
2016 Australian television series debuts
English-language television shows
Australian television sketch shows